The president of Zimbabwe is the head of state of Zimbabwe and head of the executive branch of the government of Zimbabwe. The president chairs the national cabinet and is the chief commanding authority of the Zimbabwe Defence Forces.

The incumbent president is Emmerson Mnangagwa, installed on 24 November 2017 after his predecessor, Robert Mugabe resigned in the aftermath of a 2017 coup d'état.

History of the office

The office of the president of Zimbabwe was established in 1980, when the country gained independence from the United Kingdom. Per the Lancaster House Agreement, Zimbabwe was originally a parliamentary republic, with the president serving in mostly a ceremonial role. Real power was vested in the prime minister, Robert Mugabe.

A Methodist minister, Canaan Banana, became the first president, serving until 1987. He resigned in 1987 shortly after the Constitution was amended to make the presidency an executive post, and the office of Prime Minister was abolished. Mugabe was appointed to succeed him, and was elected in his own right in 1990 and four more times thereafter.

The office of Prime Minister was restored as a result of the 2008–09 political negotiations, but abolished again following the 2013 constitutional referendum. Under the rules adopted by the same referendum, the president serves a maximum of two five-year terms. This did not have a retroactive effect on past terms of office already served or currently being served as of 2013.

2017 coup d'état and Mugabe's resignation

On 14 November 2017, armed military personnel from the Zimbabwe Defence Forces invaded the Zimbabwe Broadcasting Corporation studios in Harare before Major General Sibusiso Moyo came out on a live television broadcast declaring that the army had activated an operation that would later be known as "Operation Restore Legacy." Moyo stated that President Mugabe and his family would be safe and their security would be guaranteed, as the operation was only targeting criminals around him. What followed thereafter was a well-planned and carefully executed crackdown on members of a faction within the ruling ZANU-PF party known as G40. The Zimbabwe Republic Police and the Central Intelligence Organisation, both deemed loyal to the president, were neutralised by the army, which arrested some of their top leaders.

On 21 November 2017, facing all-but certain impeachment from a combined session of the House of Assembly and Senate, Mugabe resigned as president. Former vice president Emmerson Mnangagwa was sworn in as his replacement on 24 November 2017.

Presidents of Zimbabwe (1980–present)

Phelekezela Mphoko was the second (and only sitting) vice-president at the time of Mugabe's resignation on 21 November 2017. Mphoko may have been acting president of Zimbabwe for three days until Mnangagwa's accession to the presidency. However, as Mphoko was not in the country at the time, and due to the unusual circumstances, any official standing on this is unclear and may never be known.

Rank by time in office

Latest election

Mnangagwa ran for re-election in 2018 as the ZANU–PF candidate. Morgan Tsvangirai, the leader of the main opposition party MDC-T, had died earlier in the year and been replaced by Nelson Chamisa. Chamisa ran as the MDC Alliance candidate against Mnangagwa. Mnangagwa was re-elected without the need for a runoff, winning 50.8% of the vote to Chamisa's 44.3%. The election result was disputed by the MDC Alliance.

See also
List of heads of state of Zimbabwe
Prime Minister of Zimbabwe
Vice President of Zimbabwe
President of Rhodesia
President of Zimbabwe Rhodesia

References

Zimbabwe
President

Presidents
1980 establishments in Zimbabwe